Ingrid Sandvik (2 June 1921 – 16 June 1976) was a Norwegian politician for the Labour Party.

She rose in the ranks of the Labour Party, from the Workers' Youth League to being elected to Orkdal municipal council. At the time, she was the only female councillor. When becoming mayor of Orkdal in 1968, she was the only female mayor in Norway. She was also a member of the county school board, and was deputy county mayor. She served as a deputy representative to the Parliament of Norway from Sør-Trøndelag during the terms 1969–1973 and 1973–1977. In total she met during 79 days of parliamentary session.

Before the end of her last term as a Parliament deputy, she died following a period of illness. She had already stepped down as mayor in 1975 for the same reason.

References

1921 births
1976 deaths
People from Orkdal
Deputy members of the Storting
Labour Party (Norway) politicians
Mayors of places in Sør-Trøndelag
Women mayors of places in Norway
Women members of the Storting